

This is a detailed table of the National Register of Historic Places listing in Major County, Oklahoma.

This is intended to be a detailed table of the property on the National Register of Historic Places in Major County, Oklahoma, United States. Latitude and longitude coordinates are provided for this property; they may be seen in a map.

There are 3 properties listed on the National Register in the county.

Current listing

|}

See also
 List of National Historic Landmarks in Oklahoma
 National Register of Historic Places listings in Oklahoma

References

 
Major County